Lapui-ye Do (also Romanized as Lapū’ī-ye Do; also known as Lapū’ī) is a village in Howmeh-ye Sharqi Rural District, in the Central District of Ramhormoz County, Khuzestan Province, Iran. At the 2006 census, its population was 367, in 75 families.

References 

Populated places in Ramhormoz County